Baron Basset, of Stratton in the County of Cornwall, was a title in the Peerage of Great Britain. It was created in 1797 for Francis Basset, 1st Baron de Dunstanville, with remainder, failing heirs male of his own, to his daughter the Honourable Frances Basset. He had already been created a baronet, of Tehidy in the County of Cornwall, in the Baronetage of Great Britain in 1779, and Baron de Dunstanville, of Tehidy in the County of Cornwall, in the Peerage of Ireland in 1796. Both these titles were created with normal remainder to heirs male. Lord de Dunstanville and Basset was the eldest son of Francis Basset. The baronetcy and barony of de Dunstanville became extinct on his death in 1835 while he was succeeded in the barony of Basset according to the special remainder by his daughter, Frances, the second Baroness Basset. She never married and the barony became extinct on her death in 1855.

The choice of "de Dunstanville" as a title recalls the name of Reginald de Dunstanville, who was Earl of Cornwall in the twelfth century.

Baron de Dunstanville (1796)
Francis Basset, 1st Baron de Dunstanville (1757–1835)

Barons Basset (1797)
Francis Basset, 1st Baron de Dunstanville, 1st Baron Basset (1757–1835)
Frances Basset, 2nd Baroness Basset (1781–1855)

See also

Basset (family)

References

Oxford Dictionary of National Biography article by Roland Thorne, ‘Basset, Francis, Baron de Dunstanville and first Baron Basset (1757–1835)’ online edn, Oct 2006 , accessed 30 June 2007.

Baronies in the Peerage of Great Britain
Extinct baronies in the Peerage of Great Britain
Cornish nobility
Baron Basset
Noble titles created in 1797
Peerages created with special remainders